X-Ray Mega Airport (also known as Inside Frankfurt Airport) is a five-part British television series which premiered on 21 May 2015 on the Discovery Channel in the United Kingdom and subsequently on international versions of the Discovery Channel in more than 220 territories. The program was commissioned by Discovery International in 2014, and is produced by Voltage TV.

The series examines Frankfurt International Airport using CGI, laser scanning technology and thermal cameras to investigate the science and technology behind aviation.

Episodes

Broadcast
In the United Kingdom, the series premiered on the Discovery Channel on 21 May 2015. In Germany, the setting for the program, the series premiered under the title Inside Frankfurt Airport on 26 May 2015 on the German Discovery Channel.

In Australia, the series premiered on 9 June 2015 on the Australian Discovery Channel and was watched by 6,000 viewers overnight and another 10,000 viewers who timeshifted the program within 7 days. It premiered on the English language Southeast Asian feed of Discovery Channel Asia on 24 June 2015. The series premiered in the United States on 3 January 2016 on the Smithsonian Channel to 78,000 viewers.

References

External links
Discovery Channel: X-Ray Mega Airport

2010s British documentary television series
2015 British television series debuts
2015 British television series endings
2010s British television miniseries
Discovery Channel original programming
English-language television shows
Documentary television series about aviation